James Doleman is a New Zealand professional rugby union referee.

Refereeing career
Doleman began refereeing while a student in Dunedin, becoming a professional referee in 2020. In 2019 he had refereed the final of the 2019 World Rugby Under 20 Championship. He also refereed the Championship final of the 2020 Mitre 10 Cup as  played .

References

New Zealand rugby union referees
Super Rugby referees
1991 births

Living people